Emile Wabé Béaruné (born 7 February 1990) is a New Caledonian international footballer who plays as a defender for Hienghène Sport in the New Caledonia Super Ligue and the New Caledonia national team.

References

1990 births
Living people
New Caledonian footballers
New Caledonia international footballers
Association football defenders
Gaïtcha FCN players
2012 OFC Nations Cup players
2016 OFC Nations Cup players